Elk County (county code EK) is a county located in the U.S. state of Kansas. As of the 2020 census, the county population was 2,483. Its county seat and most populous city is Howard.

History

Early history

For many millennia, the Great Plains of North America was inhabited by nomadic Native Americans.  From the 16th century to 18th century, the Kingdom of France claimed ownership of large parts of North America.  In 1762, after the French and Indian War, France secretly ceded New France to Spain, per the Treaty of Fontainebleau.

19th century
In 1802, Spain returned most of the land to France, but keeping title to about 7,500 square miles.  In 1803, most of the land for modern day Kansas was acquired by the United States from France as part of the 828,000 square mile Louisiana Purchase for 2.83 cents per acre.

In 1854, after first serving as an area to relocate Native American tribes from the east, the United States organized Kansas Territory. In 1861, Kansas was admitted as the 34th U.S. state. The area that today is Elk County was, for a brief period, reserved to the Osage Indians as hunting grounds for buffalo and other game. In 1867, when Howard County was formed, it encompassed both present day Elk and Chautauqua counties. Disputes over county seats caused a division. In 1875, Elk County was established, named for the Elk River.

The first railroad in Elk County was built in 1879. It connected cattle ranches and farms to eastern markets.

Geography

Adjacent counties
 Greenwood County (north)
 Wilson County (east)
 Montgomery County (southeast)
 Chautauqua County (south)
 Cowley County (southwest)
 Butler County (northwest)

Demographics

 
As of the 2000 census, there were 3,261 people, 1,412 households, and 923 families residing in the county.  The population density was 5 people per square mile (2/km2).  There were 1,860 housing units at an average density of 3 per square mile (1/km2).  The racial makeup of the county was 95.06% White, 0.21% Black or African American, 0.95% Native American, 0.18% Asian, 0.06% Pacific Islander, 1.20% from other races, and 2.33% from two or more races. Hispanic or Latino of any race were 2.18% of the population.

There were 1,412 households, out of which 24.40% had children under the age of 18 living with them, 56.00% were married couples living together, 6.10% had a female householder with no husband present, and 34.60% were non-families. 32.90% of all households were made up of individuals, and 18.60% had someone living alone who was 65 years of age or older.  The average household size was 2.25 and the average family size was 2.84.

In the county, the population was spread out, with 22.50% under the age of 18, 5.80% from 18 to 24, 20.00% from 25 to 44, 26.50% from 45 to 64, and 25.30% who were 65 years of age or older.  The median age was 46 years. For every 100 females there were 91.50 males.  For every 100 females age 18 and over, there were 91.70 males.

The median income for a household in the county was $27,267, and the median income for a family was $34,148. Males had a median income of $28,580 versus $16,219 for females. The per capita income for the county was $16,066.  About 9.20% of families and 13.80% of the population were below the poverty line, including 18.80% of those under age 18 and 15.00% of those age 65 or over.

Government

Presidential elections

Laws
The Kansas Constitution was amended in 1986 to allow the sale of alcoholic liquor by the individual drink, with approval by voters. Elk County voters have chosen to remain a prohibition, or "dry", county.

Education

Unified school districts
 West Elk USD 282
 Elk Valley USD 283

Communities

Cities
 Elk Falls
 Grenola
 Howard
 Longton
 Moline

Unincorporated communities
 Busby
 Oak Valley

Ghost towns
 Cave Springs
 Fiat
 Upola

Townships
Elk County is divided into ten townships.  None of the cities within the county is designated as governmentally independent. All population figures for the townships include those of the cities.  In the following table, the population center is the largest city (or cities) included in that township's population total, if it is of a significant size.

See also
 National Register of Historic Places listings in Elk County, Kansas

References

Further reading

 Elk County, Kansas; H. F. Smith; 1927.
 Handbook of Elk and Chautauqua Counties, Kansas; C.S. Burch Publishing Co; 24 pages; 1886.
 Elk County Rural Landowners Plat Map; 1927.
 Standard Atlas of Elk County, Kansas; George A. Ogle & Co; 43 pages; 1903.
 Atlas of Elk County; Davy Map & Atlas Co; 45 pages; 1885.

External links

County
 
 Elk County - Directory of Public Officials
Maps
 Elk County Maps: Current, Historic, KDOT
 Kansas Highway Maps: Current, Historic, KDOT
 Kansas Railroad Maps: Current, 1996, 1915, KDOT and Kansas Historical Society

 
Kansas counties
Populated places established in 1875
1875 establishments in Kansas